Ka Re Durava is an Indian Marathi-language TV series which aired on Zee Marathi. It starred Suruchi Adarkar and Suyash Tilak in lead roles. The series premiered from 18 August 2014 by replacing Eka Lagnachi Teesri Goshta.

Synopsis 
It is a story of young married couple, Jay and Aditi. Living in the Mumbai and carrying even bigger dreams. They are come from a middle-class family and find happiness in the small things. They believe in working hard towards their goals. After that, they land in the same office where they have to keep their "married" status a secret. So, they are at home a much in love married couple and in office they are not more than colleagues.

Plot 
Jayram "Jay" Khanolkar is a young man from an impoverished background who desires to start his own business. He is married to his college friend Aditi Dabholkar, the only child of the wealthy Anil Dabholkar. Jay and Aditi struggle to make ends meet. Anil resents Jay because of the hardship his daughter endures, although he refuses to acknowledge that Aditi married Jay of her own free will.

Desperate for money, Aditi joins Dev Tours, run by Avinash Dev, despite its policy of not recruiting married employees. Few days later, due to unfortunate circumstance, one of Jay's business deals goes awry. Jay is compelled to accept a loan of ₹5 lakh from Avinash and join his company. Due to dire financial straits, Jay and Aditi reluctantly conceal their married status and pretend to be ordinary colleagues.

Thus the couple spend their days weaving a web of lies to overcome situations. Jay and Aditi take up residence in Bandra and become close to their landlord, Dinanath Ketkar and his wife. On one hand, the responsibility of the Khanolkar family gradually falls entirely on Jay's shoulders. On the other hand, love triangle ensues in the office with Rajni and Jui falling for Jay. Avinash develops feelings for Aditi but is jealous of her closeness with Jay.

During his work, Jay crosses paths with his father-in-law. Although Anil is livid upon learning the entire situation, he doesn't expose Jay and instead uses it as leverage to harass him by demanding unreasonable standards at work. Initially, Jay tolerates it, but is infuriated with Anil's behaviour. He deftly manipulates situations and becomes so successful at work that Anil cannot do anything about it. Anil deceives Aditi by pretending to be nice to Jay, while Jay does not disclose the ruse for Aditi's happiness.

Eventually, Anil discovers that Avinash's mother wishes Aditi to be her daughter-in-law. He proposes a collaboration with Avinash on a grand project, and Jay is appointed as its leader. Anil also creates opportunities for Avinash and Aditi to be together and uses that to torment Jay. On the other hand, irritated by Rajni's antagonism towards Aditi, Jay forcefully rejects her. Few days later, Jay learns of Avinash's decision to make him a business partner along with Anil Dabholkar.

Later, Anil threatens Jay that if Aditi leaves Dev Tours, he will withdraw his entire investment from Avinash's dream project and pin the blame on Jay. Avinash proposes to Aditi who is horrified. Later, in a desperate bid to persuade Aditi to accept Avinash's proposal, Anil reveals his threat to Jay, upsetting Aditi. Eventually the couple reveal their married status to everyone and are forgiven because of their immense contribution. The story ends with Anil accepting Jay and Aditi's marriage.

Cast

Main 
 Suyash Tilak as Jayram Parshuram Khanolkar
 Suruchi Adarkar as Aditi Jayram Khanolkar / Aditi Dabholkar

Recurring 
Jay's relatives
 Arun Nalawade as Ketkar Kaka
 Rajan Bhise as Mr. Dabholkar
 Manasi Magikar as Ketkar Kaku
 Prajakta Dighe-Kulkarni as Mrs. Dabholkar
 Prafull Samant as Parshuram Khanolkar (Anna)
 Vandana Marathe as Jay's mother
 Sheetal Kshirsagar as Shobha Abhiram Khanolkar
 Unknown as Abhiram Parshuram Khanolkar
 Unknown as Chinu
 Rajshri Nikam as Shakuntala
 Amit Khedekar as Suhas

Office staff
 Subodh Bhave as Avinash Deo
 Neha Joshi as Rajani
 Sunil Tawde as Arvind Kadam
 Vishakha Subhedar as Nandini
 Archana Nipankar as Jui Gadgil
 Ila Bhate as Avinash's mother (Aau)
 Neha Shitole as Naina
 Omprakash Shinde as Saiprasad
 Sunil Godbole as Mr. Navare
 Umesh Jagtap as Mr. Tangade
 Shalaka Pawar as Tilottama
 Kalpana Sarang as Devyani
 Unknown as Sarika
 Unknown as Amit

Awards

Special episode (1 hour) 
 12 October 2014
 19 July 2015
 27 September 2015
 27 March 2016

References

External links 
 
 Ka Re Durava at ZEE5

Marathi-language television shows
2014 Indian television series debuts
Zee Marathi original programming
2016 Indian television series endings